The 1984 Dutch Open was a Grand Prix men's tennis tournament staged in Hilversum, Netherlands. The tournament was played on outdoor clay courts and was held from 23 July until 29 July 1984. It was the 28th edition of the tournament. Anders Järryd won the singles title.

Finals

Singles

 Anders Järryd defeated  Tomáš Šmíd 6–3, 6–3, 2–6, 6–2

Doubles

 Anders Järryd /  Tomáš Šmíd defeated  Broderick Dyke /  Michael Fancutt 6–4, 5–7, 7–6

References

External links
 ITF tournament edition details

Dutch Open (tennis)
Dutch Open (tennis)
Dutch Open
Dutch Open
Dutch Open (tennis), 1984